MSK or The Rascalz were an American professional wrestling stable and later, tag team. It was formed by Dezmond Xavier, Trey Miguel, Zachary Wentz and Myron Reed. They began teaming with each other for the first time on the independent circuit in 2015 and competed in various independent promotions. They soon joined a stable called Scarlet and Graves, which primarily competed in Combat Zone Wrestling (CZW) as well as other independent promotions. In 2018, the stable ended as Xavier and Wentz went on to form a new tag team called The Rascalz. They were soon joined by Myron Reed and Trey Miguel, but Reed soon left the group and the remaining three continued on as a trio, making their debut in Impact Wrestling shortly after.

The trio would depart from the company in November 2020 with Xavier and Wentz signing with WWE the following month while Miguel went his separate way and returned to Impact Wrestling the following January. In WWE, Xavier and Wentz names were changed to Wes Lee and Nash Carter and performed as MSK on the NXT brand, where they were two-time NXT Tag Team Champions. In April 2022, Wentz would be fired from WWE as a result of multiple allegations. After Wentz returned to the indies, he would rejoin Reed and Miguel who had been using the Rascalz name on the indies.

History

Background and formation 
Dezmond Xavier and Zachary Wentz teamed with each other for the first time at a Rockstar Pro event Amped on December 12, 2015 by defeating Ohio Is 4 Killers (Dave Crist and Jake Crist). They soon formed an alliance with Dave Crist, JT Davidson and Brittany Blake called Scarlet And Graves at a Combat Zone Wrestling event Seventeen on February 13, 2016 by defeating Conor Claxton, Frankie Pickard and Neiko Sozio. Xavier and Wentz won many tag team titles as part of the stable including the CZW World Tag Team Championship twice and the All American Wrestling Tag Team Championship once. In CZW, they split up from Dave Crist and JT Davidson, with whom Xavier and Wentz had begun feuding and continued to compete as Scarlet And Graves. Xavier and Wentz teamed with their future partner Trey Miguel for the first time to defeat Ohio Is 4 Killers (Dave Crist, Jake Crist and Sami Callihan) in a doors match at EVILution on July 8, 2017.

Scarlet and Graves dissolved in 2017 and Xavier and Wentz formed a tag team called The Rascalz in Fight Club Pro by teaming with Meiko Satomura against Travis Banks and Aussie Open in a six-person tag team match at the second day of the Dream Tag Team Invitational tournament on March 31, 2018.

Independent circuit (2018–2020) 
Xavier and Wentz added Trey Miguel and Myron Reed as the new members of Rascalz in CZW at Welcome to the Combat Zone on April 7, 2018. They defeated Bandido and Flamita and Ohio Versus Everything in a three-way match. At FCP's International Tekkers: Nothing Is True, Everything Is Permitted, Xavier and Wentz captured The Wrestling Revolver's PWR Tag Team Championship by defeating the defending champions Millie McKenzie and Pete Dunne and The Besties In The World (Davey Vega and Mat Fitchett) in a three-way match. They successfully defended the titles in a one-night tag team tournament against Killer Death Machines (Jessicka Havok and Nevaeh), The Crew (Jason Cade and Shane Strickland) and The Latin American Exchange (Santana and Ortiz) at Catalina Wrestling Mixer 2. Miguel and Reed also participated in the tournament, losing to Besties in the World in the opening round. Rascalz held the PWR Tag Team Championship until It's Always Sunny In Iowa on March 3, 2019, where they lost the titles to Latin American Exchange in a three-way match, also involving Besties in the World. Reed would leave the group after Miguel, Xavier and Wentz signed with Impact Wrestling.

On May 12, Miguel and Wentz won the WC Big Top Tag Team Championship at WrestleCircus event Encore by defeating The Dirty Devils (Andy Dalton and Isaiah James) and The Riegel Twins (Logan and Sterling) in a three-way match. After a successful title defense against Riegel Twins and Private Party at Big Top Revival, Miguel and Wentz vacated the titles on July 25. In the United Kingdom-based Southside Wrestling Entertainment, Xavier and Wentz captured the SWE Tag Team Championship by defeating Chris Tyler and Stixx at III Manors on August 10. They lost the titles to Deadly Sins at Lock, Stock And Three Smoking Rascalz.

Pro Wrestling Guerrilla (2018–2020) 
Dezmond Xavier and Zachary Wentz debuted for Pro Wrestling Guerrilla (PWG) at Time is a Flat Circle on March 23, 2018 by defeating Bandido and Flamita in a tag team match. The following month, during the night one of All Star Weekend on April 20, Rascalz defeated The Chosen Bros (Jeff Cobb and Matt Riddle) and The Young Bucks in a three-way match to capture the World Tag Team Championship. Rascalz made their first successful title defense the following night against Violence Unlimited. Rascalz would retain the titles throughout the rest of 2018 and 2019 as they successfully defended the titles against Young Bucks, Lucha Brothers, Latin American Exchange and Best Friends in quick succession. At Two Hundred, Rascalz retained the title against LAX and Lucha Brothers in a three-way match. They successfully defended the titles against Flamita and Rey Horus at Mystery Vortex VI and LAX in a ladder match at Sixteen.
Due to the COVID-19 pandemic causing PWG to postpone running shows for over a year, the team remained champions even after signing with WWE/NXT. Their reign is the longest ever in the promotion’s history.

Impact Wrestling (2018–2020) 
The Rascalz signed with Impact Wrestling in the fall of 2018. Dezmond Xavier had already worked for Impact, having won the Super X Cup tournament the previous year. Zachary Wentz and Trey Miguel made their first appearance in Impact by teaming with Ace Austin as enhancement talents against oVe (Dave Crist, Jake Crist and Sami Callihan) in a losing effort on the September 6 episode of Impact!. A vignette aired promoting the debut of Rascalz on the November 15 episode of Impact!. Rascalz made their debut as a fan favorite team on the November 29 episode of Impact! as Xavier and Wentz defeated Chris Bey and Mike Sydal. Miguel was in their corner for the match. Rascalz began their feud against Moose in 2019, which led to Rascalz making their pay-per-view debut against Moose and The North in a six-man tag team match at Rebellion, which Rascalz lost. During the match, the ring names of Xavier, Miguel and Wentz were shortened to Dez, Trey and Wentz respectively.

Dez and Wentz would lose to North at Code Red. The Rascalz would then go on to defeat oVe members Dave Crist, Jake Crist and Madman Fulton at A Night You Can't Mist. On the June 7 episode of Impact Wrestling, Dez and Wentz received their first opportunity for the World Tag Team Championship against The Latin American Exchange (Santana and Ortiz), which they lost via disqualification after Wentz interfered in the match. This led to a rematch between the two teams for the titles at Slammiversary XVII. On the July 5 episode of Impact Wrestling, Dez and Wentz defeated Trey in a three-way match to earn the right to be LAX's opponents at Slammiversary. In the meanwhile, LAX lost the titles to The North, which led to North being added into the match, making it a three-way match for the titles, where North retained the titles. Rascalz would then defeat Andy Dalton, Matthew Palmer and Steve O Reno at Bash at the Brewery.

At Slammiversary, The Rascalz, represented by Dez and Wentz, issued an open challenge to any tag team. The reunited Motor City Machine Guns accepted the challenge and won the match. Trey challenged for the vacant Impact World Championship in the main event. However, the match was won by Eddie Edwards.

On November 11, it was revealed that The Rascalz would be leaving Impact amid interest from both WWE and All Elite Wrestling. During the November 17 tapings, The Rascalz were given a "send off" by the Impact locker room. Trey confirmed the following day that he, Dez and Wentz were in fact finished with Impact Wrestling. However, since then, Trey Miguel has made his return to IMPACT, effectively ending The Rascalz as a trio.

WWE (2020–2022) 
On December 2, 2020, it was announced that Dezmond Xavier and Zachary Wentz had signed with WWE and would be reporting to the WWE Performance Center.

On the January 13, 2021 episode of NXT, Xavier and Wentz debuted as Wes Lee and Nash Carter respectively under the new team name MSK. They defeated Jake Atlas and Isaiah "Swerve" Scott in the first round of the Dusty Rhodes Tag Team Classic tournament. The duo then defeated Drake Maverick and Killian Dain in the second round on the January 27 episode of NXT to advance to the semi-finals. On the February 10 episode, they defeated Legado Del Fantasma in the semi-finals. On February 14, at NXT TakeOver: Vengeance Day, MSK defeated the Grizzled Young Veterans in the finals to become the 2021 Dusty Rhodes Tag Team Classics Winners. At NXT Takeover: Stand & Deliver, MSK defeated Grizzled Young Veterans and Legado Del Fantasma in a triple threat tag team match to win the vacant NXT Tag Team Championship. MSK would have their first successful title defense against the team of Killian Dain and Drake Marverick on the April 13 episode of NXT. At NXT Takeover: In Your House, MSK would team with NXT North American Champion, Bronson Reed to take on Legado Del Fantasma in a winners take all match, where the team of MSK and Reed would be successful. At NXT: The Great American Bash, MSK would defeat Tommaso Ciampa and Timothy Thatcher to retain their NXT Tag Team Titles.  On the September 8 episode of NXT, MSK would defeat Oney Lorcan and Danny Burch to retain the NXT Tag Team Titles. On the October 5 episode of NXT 2.0, MSK would successfully defend their Tag Titles in a fatal-4-way elimination match. At NXT: Halloween Havoc on October 26, MSK would lose their titles to Imperium, ending their reign at 201 days. They would regain their title from Imperium several months later on April 2, 2022, at NXT Stand & Deliver in a triple threat match that also involved The Creed Brothers. However a few days later on April 6, Nash Carter would be released from his WWE contract and two days later, the NXT Tag Team Championship would be declared vacant.

Independent circuit (2022) 
On June 9, it was announced that the Rascalz would be reforming with Miguel, Wentz and Reed, facing the team of Blake Christian, Nick Wayne and Fuego Del Sol at Warrior Wrestling 24 on June 26.

Championships and accomplishments 
 All American Wrestling
 AAW Tag Team Championship (1 time) – Xavier and Wentz
Combat Zone Wrestling
CZW World Tag Team Championship (2 times) – Xavier and Wentz
 Impact Wrestling
 Turkey Bowl (2018) – Xavier with KM, Alisha Edwards, Kikutaro, Fallah Bahh
 Impact Super X Cup – Xavier 
Pro Wrestling Guerrilla
PWG World Tag Team Championship (1 time) – Xavier and Wentz
Southside Wrestling Entertainment
SWE Tag Team Championship (1 time) – Xavier and Wentz
The Wrestling Revolver
PWR Tag Team Championship (1 time) – Xavier and Wentz
PWR Tag Team Championship One Night Tag Team Tournament (2018) – Xavier and Wentz
WrestleCircus
WC Big Top Tag Team Championship (1 time) – Miguel and Wentz
WWE 
NXT Tag Team Championship (2 times) – Lee and Carter
Men's Dusty Rhodes Tag Team Classic (2021) – Lee and Carter
 Xtreme Intense Championship Wrestling
 XICW Tag Team Championship (1 time) – Miguel, Xavier, and Wentz with Aaron Williams, Dave Crist, and Kyle Maverick

References

External links 
The Rascalz profile at Impact Wrestling
The Rascalz profile at Cagematch
The Rascalz profile at Wrestlingdata

Impact Wrestling teams and stables
Independent promotions teams and stables
WWE NXT teams and stables